Love Story is the third studio album by American rapper Yelawolf. It was released on April 21, 2015, by Interscope Records, Shady Records and Slumerican. The album was described by Yelawolf as a more passionate album than his debut album. Recording process took place primarily in Nashville, Tennessee from 2012 to 2015. The production on the album was handled by Yelawolf himself, along with Eminem (who also served as the executive producer), Malay and WLPWR, among others. The album was influenced by aspects of country and rock.

Love Story was supported by five singles: "Box Chevy V", "Till It's Gone", "Whiskey in a Bottle", "American You" and "Best Friend" featuring Eminem. Love Story received generally positive reviews from critics, who praised the album's emotional feel as well as its ambition and production, but criticized its length. The album debuted at number three on the US Billboard 200, selling 51,000 copies in its first week.

Background 
In April 2012, Yelawolf said, "The focus of the album is the experience since Radioactive (2011) and just putting all that into a project." He also spoke about Love Story, and how it would be different compared to his debut effort Radioactive. He said, "With Radioactive, I gave up a lot of creative space, and like I predicted would happen, there were some records that didn't translate to my audience." Yelawolf also said this album contains more straight up passion in the songs and there is no guidelines for the album. He also said, "I'm telling the truth about a lot of things. This album is in line with it having a concept and a theme. This is what makes my music special and makes me want to keep making music. I try to be as honest as I can with everything I do."

Release and promotion 
Following the release of his debut album, Radioactive (2011), Yelawolf had been touring with Lil Wayne and Travis Barker on the I Am Music Tour. During the tour, he frequently collaborated with Barker, with whom he released an EP, Psycho White on November 13, 2012. In 2012, Yelawolf released his first collaborative album The Slumdon Bridge with Ed Sheeran, and later released his fifth mixtape, Heart of Dixie. On March 14, 2013, Yelawolf released his sixth mixtape Trunk Muzik Returns, containing ten tracks with guest appearances from Raekwon, Paul Wall, Killer Mike and ASAP Rocky. The mixtape was also entirely produced by his go-to producer WLPWR.

On October 31, 2013, Yelawolf released another mixtape, titled Black Fall, and this time it was produced entirely by Three 6 Mafia's DJ Paul. From November 14 to 23, 2013, Yelawolf was touring with Funk Volume's artist Hopsin, in promotion of Love Story, on the Fuck It Tour. The tour consists of primarily small, intimate venues in the West Coast of the United States. At first, the album was set to be released in 2012, however, that would be pushed to 2013, due to time constraints. In November 2013, Yelawolf confirmed to XXL, stating that the album is now will be released in 2014.

Singles 
On January 3, 2014, Yelawolf announced that the album's lead single would be the fifth installment in the Box Chevy series, titled "Box Chevy V". It was released on January 28, 2014, and on the following day, it was made available for digital download. The song has a mellow groove, and the WLPWR made production features twinkling keys and guitar licks. The music video was filmed in Granville, Tennessee, and was released on April 4, 2014.

On September 16, 2014, the album's second single, "Till It's Gone", premiered on episode two of the seventh season of Sons of Anarchy, on the following day, it was released on the web. On October 14, 2014, the music video was released for "Till It's Gone". The song was produced by WLPWR.

The album's third single, "Whiskey in a Bottle", was released on February 17, 2015. The song was produced by WLPWR.

The album's fourth single, "American You", was released on March 23, 2015. The song was produced by Malay, with co-production by Eminem, while the additional production by Luis Resto.

The album's fifth single, "Best Friend", was released on April 14, 2015. The song features a guest appearance from American rapper Eminem, while the production was handled by WLPWR.

Other songs 
The album's promotional single, titled "Honey Brown", was released for digital download on July 1, 2014. The song was produced by DJ Paul and Malay.

Critical reception 

Love Story was met with generally positive reviews. At Metacritic, which assigns a normalized rating out of 100 to reviews from mainstream publications, the album received an average score of 64, based on 10 reviews.

Ken Capobianco of The Boston Globe gave the album a positive review while calling the album "a striking improvement over 2011's messy, compromised "Radioactive"....if you scratch his songs' surfaces, you hear a smart, sensitive outsider searching for some solace." He would go on to praise the album for its "undeniable emotional pull". Renato Pagnani of Rolling Stone calling the album a "stronger embrace of his southern roots", while also adding that "Yelawolf's populist ambitions haven't gone away." Chris Mench of Complex saying "The album layers the trailer park swagger of his early work over rootsy country music instrumentals, and it's largely successful". He would go on to criticize the albums length by saying "If Love Story ended at its title song, it could have been a truly great project...its solid momentum really fizzles out in the last few songs, making for a disappointing finale of an otherwise solid effort".

Marcus Dowling of HipHopDX said: "On Love Story, the effort, creativity and ambition is more than there, and his tremendous talents as an emcee and clear artistic voice are very much present." He would go on to say the album is "disjointed but not jagged...the closer Yelawolf stays to his more organic-to-his-roots style of Southern rap, he excels." Miranda J. of XXL stating that Yelawolf is "in tune with his southern roots on Love Story ... there's a sense of self awareness and confidence that seems to have been missing before...He's fully aware of who exactly he wants to be in hip-hop: a proud, raw, unapologetically Southern MC, something the game’s been missing".

In a mixed review, Drew Millard of Spin stated: "Nobody else has tried to mash murder ballads, hardcore rap, bluegrass, backwoods country, and feather-light guitar-pop into one album, pretty much ever ... Your enjoyment of Love Story will directly correlate with the amount that you enjoy Yelawolf's singing, because boy howdy is there a lot of it here". Millard additionally criticized Yelawolf's lyrics, including his usage of "the word 'faggot' multiple times on the record, which, come on, guy. It's 2015!" He added: "[W]henever he's got space in a verse to fill, it seems the guy drops some sort of complaint about the music industry". In a mostly negative review, Jay Balfour of Pitchfork wrote: "Love Story is far too long to accomplish so little ... Yelawolf sounds like he's just going through the motions instead of actually covering ground".

Commercial performance 
In the United States, Love Story debuted at number three on the Billboard 200, with 58,000 album-equivalent units; it has sold 51,000 copies in its first week. It marked as Yelawolf's first top ten entry on the Billboard 200, his first number one album on the Top R&B/Hip-Hop Albums, and the best sales week of his career so far. The album dropped to number 15 in its second week, selling 14,000 copies. As of January 2016, the album has sold 119,000. On June 8, 2018, the album was certified gold by the Recording Industry Association of America (RIAA), for combined sales and album-equivalent units of over 500,000 units.

Track listing 

Notes
  signifies a co-producer
  signifies an additional producer
 "Change" features vocals by Jessy Wilson
 "Devil in My Veins" features vocals by the McCrary Sisters

Sample credits
 "Outer Space" contains excerpts from "Walkin' After Midnight", written by Alan Block and Donn Hecht, performed by Patsy Cline.
 "Whiskey in a Bottle" contains elements of "Adormeceu", written by Antonio Cezar Albuquerque de Merces and Jorge Pereira da Neves.
 "Box Chevy V" contains elements of "Still D.R.E", written by Andre Young, Shawn Carter and Scott Storch, performed by Dr. Dre and Snoop Dogg.
 "Johnny Cash" contains excerpts from "Heaven", written by Dean Honer, Dean Manuel, Jarrod Gosling and Jim Reeves.
 "Fiddle Me This" contains elements of "Player's Ball", performed by Outkast.

Personnel

Musical

 WLPWR – keyboards, pads, drums and programming , strings , hambone 
 Mike Hartnett – guitar , bass 
 Rob "Stone" Cureton – bass 
 Malay – guitar, bass, keyboards, programming and recording 
 DJ Klever – turntables , percussion 
 Zach Casebolt – violin , fiddle 
 Luis Resto – keyboards 
 Robby Turner – pedal steel guitar 
 Lindsey Smith-Trostle – cello 
 Bones Owens – acoustic guitar and slide guitar 
 Geoff Firebaugh – upright bass 
 Mike Elizondo – guitar and keyboards 
 Mark Batson – keyboards 
 Lance Powlis – trumpet and talk box

Technical

 Matthew Hayes – recording , mixing 
 Randy Warnken – mixing assistance 
 Leland Elliott – recording , mixing 
 Mike Strange – recording and mixing 
 Joe Strange – recording 
 Eminem – mixing

Charts

Weekly charts

Year-end charts

Certifications

References 

2015 albums
Rap rock albums by American artists
Yelawolf albums
Shady Records albums
Interscope Records albums
Albums produced by Eminem
Albums produced by Malay (record producer)
Albums produced by WLPWR